Toni Petteri Lydman (born 25 September 1977) is a Finnish former professional ice hockey defenceman. He first played competitively in his native Finland with Tappara, and HIFK of the SM-liiga before enjoying a lengthy career in the National Hockey League with the Calgary Flames, Buffalo Sabres and the Anaheim Ducks.

Playing career
Lydman was drafted by Calgary in the fourth round, 89th overall at the 1996 NHL Entry Draft. He spent four seasons playing in Finland's SM-liiga for Tappara in Tampere and HIFK in Helsinki before making his NHL debut for the Flames in the 2000–01 NHL season.

His best season came in 2001-02, when he scored 28 points on 6 goals and 22 assists, tying for fifth for his team in assists and sixth in points scoring.
In the 2002–03 NHL season, Lydman led his defense in points with 26 and managed to remain injury-free the whole season, only missing one game due to illness. Calgary made it to the Stanley Cup finals in the 2003–04 NHL season, but Lydman missed most of their playoff campaign due to injury.
During the 2004–05 NHL lockout, which wiped out the entire 2004–05 NHL season, Lydman returned to Helsinki for HIFK but only managed to play eight games.

On 25 August 2005, Lydman was traded from Calgary to the Buffalo Sabres for a third-round draft pick (John Armstrong) in the 2006 NHL Entry Draft,

In the 2007-08 season, Lydman had the 16th most hits in the league for a defenceman.

Having lost the Olympic final (2006), World Championship final (1998, 1999), World Cup final (2004) and Stanley Cup final (2004), Lydman and his fellow countrymen Jarkko Ruutu  and Sami Salo (Kimmo Timonen also belonged to the club before winning the Stanley Cup at the end of his career(2015)), are the only members of the unofficial "Quadruple Silver Club", a somewhat humorous reference to the Triple Gold Club and the unofficial "Quadruple Gold Club" for players who have won the most important championships available to the sport.

On July 1, 2010 signed as a free agent with the Anaheim Ducks for $9 million over three years. His Ducks debut was delayed until mid-October because of problems with double vision.

After completion of the lockout shortened 2012–13 season, in which he finished the season heavily concussed from a Justin Abdelkader hit in a playoff series loss to the Detroit Red Wings, Lydman retired from professional hockey and accepted a TV analyst role to cover Finnish Hockey.

Career statistics

Regular season and playoffs

International

Awards
 Pekka Rautakallio trophy for best defenceman in the SM-liiga - 2000
 Silver Medal Winner at the 2006 Winter Olympics in Men's Ice Hockey
 Bronze Medal Winner at the 2010 Winter Olympics in Men's Ice Hockey

References

External links
 

1977 births
Living people
Anaheim Ducks players
Buffalo Sabres captains
Buffalo Sabres players
Calgary Flames draft picks
Calgary Flames players
Finnish ice hockey defencemen
HIFK (ice hockey) players
Ice hockey players at the 2006 Winter Olympics
Ice hockey players at the 2010 Winter Olympics
Medalists at the 2006 Winter Olympics
Medalists at the 2010 Winter Olympics
Olympic bronze medalists for Finland
Olympic ice hockey players of Finland
Olympic medalists in ice hockey
Olympic silver medalists for Finland
Sportspeople from Lahti
Tappara players